Watkin Herbert Williams (22 August 1845 – 19 November 1944) was Dean of St Asaph from 1892 to 1899. and Bishop of Bangor from 1899  to 1925. 

Williams was educated at Westminster School and Christ Church, Oxford and ordained in 1871. His first post was a curacy at Rhosllanerchrugog. He was vicar of Bodelwyddan from 1872 to 1892 and Archdeacon of St Asaph from 1889 to 1892.

He was a very active Freemason, initiated as a student in 1868 in Oxford's Apollo University Lodge. In Wales he joined the Royal Denbigh Lodge, and became its Worshipful Master in 1883, becoming Provincial Grand Chaplain for North Wales in the same year. He became the Grand Chaplain of the United Grand Lodge of England, the most senior clerical appointment in Freemasonry, in 1898.

References

External links

1845 births
1944 deaths
People educated at Westminster School, London
Alumni of Christ Church, Oxford
Archdeacons of St Asaph
Bishops of Bangor
Deans of St Asaph
19th-century Welsh Anglican bishops
20th-century Welsh Anglican bishops